Dee Saturday Night is a 2014 Indian Hindi-language film directed by Jay Prakash. The film released on 21 February 2014. It stars Prashant Narayanan, Arif Zakaria, Aman Verma, Amit Dimri, Vivek Rajput, Mahi Khanduri, Gaurav Dixit, Mushtaq Khan, Vishwajeet Pradhan, Nazneen Patel. Dee Saturday Night was about rave parties.

Cast
Prashant Narayanan
Arif Zakaria
Aman Verma
Mahi Khanduri as Shivani Dixit,
 Gaurav Dixit
 Mushtaq Khan
 Vishwajeet Pradhan
 Nazneen Patel
 Bobby Darling
 Amit Dimri
 Vijendra Vijay as Rajeev
 Vivek Rajput
 Wasim Khan as mangesh

Soundtrack
The music of the film was unveiled in September 2013 by Ravi Kishan.

See also
 Bollywood films of 2014

References

External links
 

2010s Hindi-language films
2014 films
Films about parties